Jackson Township is one of fourteen townships in Carroll County, Indiana. As of the 2010 census, its population was 1,391 and it contained 547 housing units.  It is uncertain how or for whom the township was named, but Adam Porter, one of the township's earliest settlers who arrived in the late 1820s, is described as hailing from Jackson Township, Virginia, and may have named it.

History
Jackson Township was organized in 1830.

Geography

Cities and towns
 Camden

Adjacent townships
 Liberty (north)
 Washington (northeast)
 Carrollton (east)
 Monroe (south)
 Deer Creek (west)
 Rock Creek (northwest)

Major highways
  Indiana State Road 75
  Indiana State Road 218

Cemeteries
The township contains four cemeteries: Musselman, Nebo, Nettle and Wise.

References
 
 United States Census Bureau cartographic boundary files

External links

 Indiana Township Association
 United Township Association of Indiana

Townships in Carroll County, Indiana
Lafayette metropolitan area, Indiana
Townships in Indiana
1830 establishments in Indiana